Ficus pakkensis is a species of plant in the family Moraceae, native to tropical northern South America.

It is found in Guyana, and in the states of Pará and Maranhão in northern Brazil.

It is an IUCN Red List Vulnerable species. The Brazilian subpopulation is confined and declining.

References

External links
 Current IUCN Red List of All Threatened Species

pakkensis
Trees of South America
Endemic flora of Brazil
Endemic flora of Guyana
Flora of Pará
Environment of Maranhão
Trees of Brazil
Vulnerable flora of South America
Taxonomy articles created by Polbot